Man at Bath is a 2010 French film by Christophe Honoré starring François Sagat and Chiara Mastroianni. The film premiered in competition at Locarno International Film Festival in Switzerland in 2010 and was released in cinemas on 22 September 2010.

This is gay pornographic actor François Sagat's second major role in general release non-pornographic film as Emmanuel after his role in L.A. Zombie. Director Christopher Honoré told French gay website Yagg.com that he was interested in Sagat because he "redefines the notion of masculinity". Sagat was the only actor to feature in two competition entries during the festival.

Plot
Right before departing to New York colleges to promote his latest collaborations, Omar (Omar Ben Sellem) goes through yet another impulsive fit from his boyfriend Emmanuel (François Sagat), resulting in rape. Resentful, Omar demands Emmanuel to be gone from his flat located in the outskirts of Paris before his return, and leaves. The two set out to live a separate series of vignettes depicting the ways the former lovers' mourn for each other.

Being a lustful, aspiring filmmaker, Omar sees his touring in upper New York as an opportunity to finally forget Emmanuel, indulging instead in disjointed recordings of his travel. Soon after, his camera work is centered on Dustin (Dustin Segura-Suarez): a young college student who is on vacation from Canada. Omar eagerly befriends and later seduces Dustin, openly portraying their desire for each other on film with an amateurish academic intent. In a matter of days, the artistic intentions in Omar's house movie devolve into a bisexual experience including Omar's professor.

Back in Paris, an animalistic Emmanuel - used to take pride on the universal praise for his body - is left broke and in denial. He resorts instead to shelter himself in Omar's place, living as carefree days as he can muster. Emmanuel goes from demanding unsolicited attentions from an upstairs neighbor who also is one of his clients as a hustler (Dennis Cooper), to hosting sexual encounters with Omar's acquaintances. All without avoiding his growing yearning for the better days with his ex, not even after luring an Omar's look-alike (Sebastian D'Azeglio) back into the apartment. After an intermission in which Emmanuel is confronted with his own collapsing lack of emotionality, he then clumsily refuses the advances of an underage boy who claims to be in need (Andréas Leflamand), nor engages in a bisexual threesome in exchange for a tip he reluctantly accepts from a successful old friend (Kate Moran). The next day, Emmanuel begrudgingly succumbs to the advances from a teenager (Rabah Zahi), and uses the opportunity to sexually lash out on the boy. Finally, shortly before Omar's return, Emmanuel cries over the improvised mural he started days earlier on one of the walls in the apartment.

Not long after, Omar enters back into his apartment, stopping to contemplate the finished mural drawn by Emmanuel, who is nowhere to be seen.

Cast
François Sagat as Emmanuel
Chiara Mastroianni as Actress
Rabah Zahi as Rabah
Omar Ben Sellem as Omar
Kate Moran as Kate
Lahcen el Mazouzi as Hicham
Andréas Leflamand as Andréas
Ronald Piwele as Ronald
Sebastian D'Azeglio as Man with a moustache
Sébastien Pouderoux as Kate's fiancé
Dennis Cooper as Robin
Dustin Segura-Suarez

References

External links
 
Interview with François Sagat about Man at Bath

2010 films
Films directed by Christophe Honoré
2010s French-language films
French LGBT-related films
2010 LGBT-related films
Gay-related films
Films set in France
2010s French films